Ferhat Mehenni, also known as Ferhat Imazighen Imula (Kabyle: Ferḥat Mḥenni or Ferḥat Imazighen Imula, born March 5, 1951), is a Kabyle political activist, singer, and founder and first President of the Movement for the Autonomy of Kabylia. He has been President of the Movement for the Self-Determination of Kabylia (formerly known as the MAK Movement) since June 1, 2010.

In 2012, Mehenni was subjected to controversy after visiting Israel, where he voiced his support and solidarity for Israel, comparing it to Kabylia.

Career and Politics

Early life 
Mehenni was born on March 5, 1951, in Illoula Oumalou, Tizi Ouzou Province, Algeria. He graduated from the University of Algiers with a degree in political science. Mehenni won first prize in the Algiers Modern Music Festival in 1973. Soon after, he began his career as a protest singer and political activist.

Activism 
Due to his hostility towards the Algerian government and extremists, Mehenni was arrested 13 times, imprisoned for 3 years, and tortured repeatedly by government forces.

In response to the Black Spring massacre in Kabylia, Mehenni established the Movement for the Autonomy of Kabylia. The MAK was later reformed into the Movement for the Self-Determination of Kabylia.

Mehenni's eldest son, Améziane Mehenni, was assassinated in 2004.

Bibliography 
Mehenni is the author of Algérie: La Question Kabyle, published in 2004, in which he explains his ideas about Kabyle nationalism.

Discography

References

1951 births
Living people
University of Algiers alumni
Berber musicians
Algerian Berber politicians
Berber activists
Kabyle independence activists
21st-century Algerian people
English-language singers from Algeria